Anton Andersson (born 15 September 1987 in Luleå) is a Swedish footballer, who is currently playing for Bodens BK.

Career
He joined the Superettan team in December 2007, coming over from Division 2 outfit IFK Luleå. The offensive midfielder left after two years GIF Sundsvall and signed for Bodens BK.

References

External links 
 
 

1987 births
Living people
Swedish footballers
GIF Sundsvall players
IFK Luleå players
People from Luleå
Association football midfielders
Sportspeople from Norrbotten County